Sorkheh County is in Semnan province, Iran. The capital of the county is the city of Sorkheh. At the 2006 census, the region's population (as Sorkheh District of Semnan County) was 14,194 in 4,195 households. The following census in 2011 counted 14,853 people in 4,659 households. At the 2016 census, the population was 15,523 in 5,330 households, by which time the district had become Sorkheh County.

Administrative divisions

The population history of Sorkheh County's administrative divisions (as a district of Semnan County) over three consecutive censuses is shown in the following table.

References

 

Counties of Semnan Province